Euphaedra confina is a butterfly in the family Nymphalidae. It is found in north-western Tanzania. The habitat consists of riparian forests.

References

Butterflies described in 1992
confina
Endemic fauna of Tanzania
Butterflies of Africa